Shelter Bay was named by Col. Robert R. McCormick in 1919 as the name of the Quebec North Shore Paper Company's port, since the name previously used for that location was Rivière-aux-Rochers (Rocky River), and vessels would be reluctant to call. It is located on the north shore of the Gulf of Saint Lawrence in Sept-Rivières Regional County Municipality in Quebec's Côte-Nord region.  The area, the people, and the founding of the paper-making enterprise are described in the book Shelter Bay by Harvey Hassall Smith, a close friend and former classmate of Arthur A. Schmon.

References
  OCLC 1033628 (Worldcat link: http://www.worldcatlibraries.org/oclc/1033628&referer=brief_results)
  OCLC 2163476
 Smith, Harvey H. (1964). Shelter Bay: Tales of the Quebec North Shore.  Toronto: McClelland & Stewart. OCLC 2169556 (Worldcat link: https://www.worldcat.org/title/shelter-bay-tales-of-the-quebec-north-shore/oclc/2169556&referer=brief_results )

Bays of Quebec
Landforms of Côte-Nord